The Grappling Federation of Armenia, is the regulating body of grappling in Armenia, governed by the Armenian Olympic Committee. The headquarters of the federation is located in Yerevan.

History
The Grappling Federation of Armenia is currently led by president Sargis Bazinyan. The Federation oversees the training of grappling specialists (known as grapplers) and organizes Armenia's participation in European and international level grappling competitions, including in the World Grappling Championships and World Junior Grappling Championships. In 2015, the Federation hosted the ADCC Submission Fighting World Championships in Yerevan.

The Federation also manages several grappling clubs throughout Armenia and hosts national tournaments. The Federation cooperates closely with the Wrestling Federation of Armenia, which itself is a member of United World Wrestling.

See also 
 Sport in Armenia
 Wrestling in Armenia

References

External links 
 Grappling Federation of Armenia on Facebook

Sports governing bodies in Armenia
Grappling